The Delaware Department of Insurance is a state agency in the U.S. State of Delaware. The agency is a member of the National Association of Insurance Commissioners (NAIC).

History 
The agency moved from its previous office at 841 Silver Lake Blvd in Dover, Delaware to its current office at 1351 West North Street in Denver in 2019.

In 2022, the Department of Insurance released a study in conjunction with the Consumer Federation of America (CFA) that found that some auto insurance companies charge women up to 21% more in premium costs compared to men. The findings led to Kyle Evans Gay, a member of the Delaware Senate, to introduce a bill that would outlaw insurance companies in the state from considering gender when charging drivers.

Leadership 
The agency is led by the Delaware Insurance Commissioner, an elected office in the U.S. State of Delaware. The current Delaware Insurance Commissioner is Democrat Trinidad Navarro, who was re-elected to a second consecutive term in office in the 2020 election.

External links 

 Delaware Department of Insurance

State agencies of Delaware
State insurance commissioners of the United States